Paola Alessandra Vaprio Medaglia was born in Ciudad de Panamá, Panamá on June 12, 1987, and stands  tall.  She competed and won the national beauty pageant Miss Mundo Panamá 2010, held in the Ascanio Arosemena Theatre, on August 26, 2010.  Paola is the sister of former Miss World Panama 2005 Anna Isabella Vaprio Medaglia.  They both represented Panama in their respective years at Miss World in Sanya, People's Republic of China.

Pageant participations
In 2010 she participated in the Señorita Panamá 2010 contest, where she did not place.

References

Miss World 2010 delegates
Living people
Panamanian beauty pageant winners
Señorita Panamá
1980s births